High-temperature corrosion is a mechanism of  corrosion that takes place when gas turbines, diesel engines, furnaces or other machinery come in contact with hot gas containing certain contaminants. Fuel sometimes contains vanadium compounds or sulfates which can form compounds during combustion having a low melting point. These liquid melted salts are strongly corrosive for stainless steel and other alloys normally inert against the corrosion and high temperatures. Other high-temperature corrosions include high-temperature oxidation, sulfidation and carbonization. High temperature oxidation and other corrosion types are commonly modelled using the Deal-Grove model to account for diffusion and reaction processes.

Sulfates
Two types of sulfate-induced hot corrosion are generally distinguished: Type I takes place above the melting point of sodium sulfate and Type II occurs below the melting point of sodium sulfate but in the presence of small amounts of SO3.

In Type I the protective oxide scale is dissolved by the molten salt. Sulfur is released from the salt and diffuses into the metal substrate forming discrete grey/blue colored aluminum or chromium sulfides so that, after the salt layer has been removed, the steel cannot rebuild a new protective oxide layer. Alkali sulfates are formed from sulfur trioxide and sodium-containing compounds. As the formation of vanadates is preferred, sulfates are formed only if the amount of alkali metals is higher than the corresponding amount of vanadium.

The same kind of attack has been observed for potassium and magnesium sulfate.

Vanadium
Vanadium is present in petroleum, especially from Canada, western United States, Venezuela and the Caribbean region, in the form of porphyrine complexes. These complexes get concentrated on the higher-boiling fractions, which are the base of heavy residual fuel oils. Residues of sodium, primarily from sodium chloride and spent oil treatment chemicals, are also present. More than 100 ppm of sodium and vanadium will yield ash capable of causing fuel ash corrosion.

Most fuels contain small traces of vanadium. The vanadium is oxidized to different vanadates. Molten vanadates present as deposits on metal can flux oxide scales and passivation layers. Furthermore, the presence of vanadium accelerates the diffusion of oxygen through the fused salt layer to the metal substrate; vanadates can be present in semiconducting or ionic form, where the semiconducting form has significantly higher corrosivity as the oxygen is transported via oxygen vacancies. Ionic form in contrast transports oxygen by diffusion of the vanadates, which is significantly slower. The semiconducting form is rich on vanadium pentoxide.

At high temperatures or lower availability of oxygen, refractory oxides - vanadium dioxide and vanadium trioxide - form. These do not promote corrosion. However, at conditions most common for burning, vanadium pentoxide gets formed. Together with sodium oxide, vanadates of various composition ratios are formed. Vanadates of composition approximating Na2O.6 V2O5 have the highest corrosion rates at the temperatures between 593 °C and 816 °C; at lower temperatures the vanadate is in solid state, at higher temperatures vanadates with higher proportion of vanadium provide higher corrosion rates.

The solubility of the passivation layer oxides in the molten vanadates depends on the composition of the oxide layer. Iron(III) oxide is readily soluble in vanadates between Na2O.6 V2O5 and 6 Na2O.V2O5, at temperatures below 705 °C in amounts up to equal to the mass of the vanadate. This composition range is common for ashes, which aggravates the problem. Chromium(III) oxide, nickel(II) oxide, and cobalt(II) oxide are less soluble in vanadates; they convert the vanadates to less corrosive ionic form and their vanadates are tightly adherent, refractory, and acting as oxygen barriers.

The corrosion rate by vanadates can be lowered by lowering the amount of excess air for combustion (thus forming preferentially the refractory oxides), refractory coatings of the exposed surfaces, or use of high-chromium alloys, e.g. 50% Ni/50% Cr or 40% Ni/60% Cr.

The presence of sodium in a ratio of 1:3 gives the lowest melting point and must be avoided. This melting point of 535 °C can cause problems on the hot spots of the engine like piston crowns, valve seats, and turbochargers.

Lead

Lead can form a low melting slag capable of fluxing protective oxide scales. Lead is more often known for causing Stress corrosion cracking in common materials when exposed to molten lead. The cracking tendency of lead has been known for some time since most iron based alloys including steel containers and vessels for molten lead baths usually fail due to cracking.

See also
Internal oxidation
Deal-Grove model
Thermal oxidation
Corrosion engineering

References

External links
Hot corrosion information

Corrosion